"Beautiful Rose" is a 1977 hit song written by Hans Bouwens, performed by the Dutch band George Baker Selection, which was No.1 on the all-Europe pop chart European Hot 100 Singles. It was taken from the album Summer Melody.

Charts

Weekly charts

Year-end charts

References

1977 singles
European Hot 100 Singles number-one singles
George Baker Selection songs
Songs written by George Baker (Dutch singer)
1977 songs